Tapinoma kinburni is a species of ant in the genus Tapinoma. Described by Karavaiev in 1937, the species is endemic to Ukraine.

References

Tapinoma
Hymenoptera of Europe
Insects described in 1937